Kuri Jajwal is a small village near the city of Gujar Khan, in the district of Rawalpindi in Pakistan.

References

Villages in Gujar Khan Tehsil